Obong Okon Ita was an Ibibio king of 
Ibom Kingdom with its seat of government in Obot Okon Ita. His kingdom was located between present day Abia and Akwa Ibom states in Southeastern Nigeria. He is the father of Akakpokpo Okon and Akpan Okon who fought for supremacy for the rulership of Ibom Kingdom

Reference

African kings
Ibibio

External links 
http://www.aro-okigbo.com/history_of_the_aros.htm
https://web.archive.org/web/20081121232256/http://www.aronetwork.org/others/arohistory.html
http://www.aronewsonline.com/origincivilization.html

Aros
History of Nigeria
Former monarchies of Africa
 
17th century in Africa
Former countries in Africa